Alois Burgstaller (21 September 1872 – 19 April 1945) was a German operatic tenor.

Burgstaller was born in Holzkirchen. A trained watchmaker, he always loved to sing and his vocal talent was discovered during an amateur theatre performance in church. Alois was encouraged to sing professionally by   Cosima Wagner, the widow of Richard Wagner, and he made a serious study of opera music. He took lessons in Frankfurt and at the Bayreuth School under Julius Kniese, making his stage debut in 1894 at the Bayreuth Festival in a small part. Alois would go on to sing the major Wagnerian roles of Siegfried, Siegmund, Erik, and Parsifal at Bayreuth from 1896 to 1903. He also performed these roles at other leading European opera houses, including those in such important cities as Paris, Zurich, Budapest, London, Amsterdam, and Moscow.

Alois made his American debut at the Metropolitan Opera, New York City, as Siegmund in "Die Walküre" on February 12, 1903. He appeared throughout the United States, singing in San Francisco, Boston, Philadelphia, Chicago, Pittsburgh, and Los Angeles during the next six or so years. His final performance, as Siegmund, occurred on January 14, 1909.

On Christmas Eve, 1903, he had sung the title role in the first staged American performance of Richard Wagner's "Parsifal" in New York City. This performance was in violation of German copyright law and angered Cosima Wagner, who was trying to keep productions of the work exclusive to Bayreuth. As a result, Alois, as well as the baritone singer Anton van Rooy and conductor Alfred Hertz, were banned from any further performances at Bayreuth. When his American career began winding down, Burgstaller appealed to the Wagner family and was eventually welcomed back to Bayreuth, performing in the festivals of 1908 and 1909.

Alois spent his old age in St. Quirin, municipality Gmund, at the Tegernsee, until his death in 1945. He lies buried at the Holzkirchner cemetery and was accorded the honor of having the local market municipality and a roadway named after him.

References
 https://web.archive.org/web/20070804152834/http://www.historicopera.com/jbayreuth1_page.htm

1872 births
1945 deaths
German operatic tenors
19th-century German male opera singers
20th-century German male opera singers
People from Miesbach (district)
Musicians from Bavaria